The Conseil scolaire catholique du Nouvel-Ontario (also known as Conseil scolaire catholique Nouvelon and formerly known as French-language Separate District School Board No. 61 prior to 1999) is a school board in the Canadian province of Ontario. The board is the school district administrator for French language Roman Catholic separate schools in the city of Greater Sudbury and the districts of Sudbury, Manitoulin and Algoma.

The Board adopted its new identity as "Conseil scolaire catholique Nouvelon" in May 2019, while retaining its legal name as Conseil scolaire catholique du Nouvel-Ontario.

Schools

Secondary

 Carrefour Options+ (Sudbury)
 École secondaire catholique Champlain (Chelmsford)
 École secondaire catholique Franco-Ouest (Espanola)
 École secondaire catholique l'Horizon (Valley East)
 École secondaire catholique Jeunesse-Nord (Blind River)
 Collège Notre-Dame (Sudbury)
 École secondaire Notre-Dame-du-Sault (Sault Ste. Marie)
 École secondaire du Sacré-Cœur (Sudbury)
 École secondaire Saint-Joseph (Wawa)
 École secondaire catholique Trillium (Chapleau)

Elementary
 École catholique  Alliance-St-Joseph (Chelmsford)
 École Félix-Ricard (Sudbury)
 École Georges-Vanier (Elliot Lake)
 École Jean-Paul II (Val Caron)
 École Notre-Dame (Hanmer)
 École Notre-Dame-de-la-Merci (Coniston)
 École Notre-Dame-du-Sault (Sault Ste. Marie)
 École Sacré-Cœur (Chapleau)
 École St-Antoine (Noëlville)
 École St-Augustin (Garson)
 École St-Charles Borromée (St. Charles)
 École St-Denis (Sudbury)
 École St-Dominique (Sudbury)
 École St-Étienne (Dowling)
 École Saint-Joseph, (Blind River)
 École St-Joseph (Hanmer)
 École St-Joseph (Sudbury)
 École St-Joseph (Dubreuilville)
 École Saint-Joseph (Espanola)
 École Saint-Joseph (Wawa)
 École St-Paul (Lively)
 École St-Pierre (Sudbury)
 École St-Thomas (Warren)
 École Saint Nom de Jésus (Hornepayne)
 École Sainte-Anne (Spanish)
 École Ste-Marie (Azilda)
 École Ste-Thérèse (Val Thérèse)

See also
List of school districts in Ontario
List of high schools in Ontario

References

External links
 School Board information
 School Board Website
 École secondaire Catholique Champlain official website

French-language school districts in Ontario
Roman Catholic school districts in Ontario
Conseil